Bangarmau Airstrip (Hindi: बांगरमऊ एयरस्ट्रिप) is an airstrip located at Bangarmau in Unnao district of Uttar Pradesh, India. The airstrip is a part of the Agra Lucknow Expressway and belongs to the Indian Air Force.

References

Indian Air Force bases
Unnao district